Valerie and Her Week of Wonders is a 1970 Czechoslovak surrealist fantasy horror film directed by Jaromil Jireš, based on the 1935 novel of the same name by Vítězslav Nezval. It is considered part of the Czechoslovak New Wave movement. The film portrays the heroine as living in a disorienting dream, cajoled by priests, vampires, and men and women alike. The film blends elements of the fantasy and gothic horror film genres.

Plot
Valerie, a beautiful young girl, is asleep when a thief steals her earrings; as she tries to investigate, she is startled by a horrific man, the Constable, who wears a mask. The thief returns her earrings the next day, angering the Constable. Back at her house, Valerie's grandmother, Elsa, tells her that the earrings were left behind by Valerie's mother upon joining a convent. Previously, the earrings belonged to the Constable, who also owned their house. Valerie also learns that a group of missionaries and a company of actors are coming to town. During her neighbor Hedvika's wedding, Valerie sees the Constable watching her in the crowd and her grandmother also seems to recognize him. Valerie receives a letter from the thief, Orlík ("Eaglet"), warning her that the Constable, his uncle, killed Orlík's parents and now wants Valerie's earrings back. Orlík asks Valerie to meet him at the church that evening; when they meet he doesn't hide his attraction to her.

Later, Valerie meets the Constable in the street, in disguise; he leads Valerie to a chamber where her grandmother whips herself to win back the love of a past lover, a priest named Gracián. Orlík saves Valerie and tells her that his uncle is in love with her. The Constable meets Elsa, who calls him Richard and was his lover when she was 17. He promises to make her young again if she sells him the house that Valerie will inherit. Meanwhile, Orlík gives Valerie a pearl for protection, then hides her from Richard again. At a picnic, Gracián tells Valerie that Orlík is her brother. That night, Gracián comes into her bedroom and attempts to rape her, but she swallows the pearl to protect herself. Meanwhile, Richard and Elsa sneak into Hedvika's; while Hedvika and her husband consummate their marriage, Elsa bites her on the neck, stealing the blood necessary to become young again.

Valerie finds Orlík bound to a waterfall by Richard. Valerie frees Orlík and takes him to her house, avoiding his romantic intentions by blindfolding him, since she now thinks they're siblings. They discover Gracián hanging dead from Valerie's window and take the body to a crypt under Valerie's house; Elsa is there, now a vampire. Disguised as a young woman, Elsa introduces herself as a distant cousin and tells Valerie that her grandmother left suddenly. She tries to bite Valerie, then restrains her while she's asleep and steals the earrings. Elsa imprisons Valerie, who then observes Elsa having sex with a man and then killing him, then attempting to seduce Orlík, who instead steals the earrings again.

Orlík frees Valerie, returns her earrings, and confesses his love for her. He tries to explain that he's not her father's son, but Richard's, but Valerie runs away. She has guessed Elsa is actually her grandmother, and started to feel something for Richard, who's dying. Valerie steals a chicken from the market and takes it to Richard, who's just told Elsa that he is Valerie's father, and that Valerie's blood is the key to their survival. When Valerie heals Richard, he reverts to being a monster and attacks her. He plans to transplant Orlík's heart into Valerie to make her immortal, but Elsa wants it for herself. Valerie, pretending to be unconscious, overhears everything. She revives Gracián, who wasn't actually dead, and finds a goodbye letter from Orlík.

Valerie meets Hedvika, sick from Elsa's bite and depressed about her marriage. They retreat into Hedvika's bedroom and spend the night together, after which Hedvika is healed. Outside, Gracián tells a crowd that Valerie is a witch who tempted him into sin. He orders her captured and burned at the stake, but Valerie swallows the magic earrings and escapes unharmed. In the crypt, now a brothel, Valerie tricks Richard into drinking one of the earrings, turning him into a polecat. In a progressively more dreamlike sequence, Valerie reunites with Orlík, revealed to be one of the actors; then Elsa, who doesn't recall anything that's happened; then her long-lost parents. In the final scene everyone dances around Valerie in the forest, while the virgins sing for her. Eventually she falls asleep in a bed in the forest, alone.

Cast
 Jaroslava Schallerová as Valerie
 Helena Anýžová as Grandmother Elsa/Mother/Redhead
 Petr Kopřiva as Orlík
 Jiří Prýmek as Constable/Richard
 Jan Klusák as Gracián
 Eva Olmerová as Maid
 Karel Engel as Coachman Ondřej
 Alena Stojáková as Hedvika
 Otto Hradecký as Farmer

Production 
The original screenplay was written by Ester Krumbachová, who is also credited with production design on the movie. The screenplay was approved in late April 1968. The movie was supposed to be directed by Krumbachová's husband Jan Němec. However, after the Warsaw Pact invasion of Czechoslovakia in August 1968, Němec was fired from Barrandov film studio and was not allowed to direct. The project then went to Jireš, and despite Jireš's 1969 feature The Joke being banned by communist authorities, production proceeded on Valerie. Jaroslava Schallerová was chosen from 1,500 girls who auditioned for the role.

The Czech town of Slavonice was chosen as the main filming location, because of its preserved renaissance-era town centre. The local people played extras. Some scenes were shot in nearby Kostelní Vydří monastery. Robert Nezval, son of the author of the novel Vítězslav Nezval, appears in the film as a boy with a drum.

Release

Home media
In January 2004, the film was released on DVD in the United States and Canada by Facets Video. In June of that same year, the film was released on DVD in the UK by Redemption Films Ltd. In June 2015, the film was released on DVD and Blu-ray by the Criterion Collection, featuring a 4K digital restoration; three early short films by director Jireš, Uncle (1959), Footprints (1960), and The Hall of Lost Steps (1960); interviews from 2006 with Jaroslava Schallerová and Jan Klusák; and an alternate psychedelic folk soundtrack by The Valerie Project.

Soundtrack
The film soundtrack, featuring music composed by Luboš Fišer, was released for the first time in December 2006 by Finders Keepers Records. Available both on CD and LP, the booklet reveals previously unseen archive images, international poster designs, as well as notes by the label founder Andy Votel, a film professor Peter Hames and Trish Keenan from the band Broadcast. In 2006, members of New Weird America acts Espers, Fern Knight, Fursaxa and other musicians formed The Valerie Project. The group performed original compositions in unison with the film from 2006 to 2008. An alternative soundtrack was made by The Valerie Project in 2006.

Critical reception 
The New York Times called the film "Consistently and humorously anticlerical", writing that it "may be the most exotic flower to bloom on the grave of the Prague Spring, but it's one with deep roots in 20th-century Czech culture".

Jordan Cronk of Slant Magazine wrote that the film "may be a willfully enigmatic, even obtuse viewing experience, but every frame continues to vibrate with energy and thrum with life", and gave the film a rating of three-and-a-half out of five stars.

University of Nebraska film studies professor Wheeler W. Dixon wrote in his book Visions of Paradise: Images of Eden in the Cinema "The film's brevity and its seductive mise-en-scène, sumptuously photographed by Jan Cuřík, make the film seem almost an outlaw project, or an act of social criticism designed to enforce atheism by embracing an anti-Catholic stance, particularly in relation to sexual morality."

In the book 101 Horror Films You Must See Before You Die, author and professor at Brunel University Tanya Krzyminska called the film "an exquisitely crafted fairy tale woven around the sexual awakening of a young woman". Krzyminska also noted that, although the film shared many similarities with soft-core pornographic films of the period, "it seeks a broader canvas in a blend of attributes drawn from both high and low culture." Krzyminska also noted the film's elements of gothic horror and fairy tales, as well as its use of symbolic imagery.

Influence 
Many writers have cited similarities between the film and the work of English writer Angela Carter, who saw the film during its release in England. Her screenplay for The Company of Wolves (1984) adapted from Carter's short stories, in collaboration with director Neil Jordan, bears a direct or indirect influence.

See also
 Vampire film

References

External links 
 
 
 
 
 Comparison between DVD and Blu-ray releases
 DVD Beaver (film review)
 Monsters at Play (film review)
Valerie and Her Week of Wonders: Grandmother, What Big Fangs You Have! an essay by Jana Prikryl at the Criterion Collection

1970s Czech-language films
1970s avant-garde and experimental films
1970s fantasy drama films
1970s horror drama films
1970 drama films
1970 horror films
1970 LGBT-related films
1970 films
Czech fantasy films
Czech dark fantasy films
Czech LGBT-related films
Czechoslovak avant-garde and experimental films
Czechoslovak drama films
Czechoslovak horror films
Films based on Czech novels
Films directed by Jaromil Jireš
Bisexuality-related films
Lesbian-related films
LGBT-related horror drama films
Vampires in film
Films about witchcraft
Films set in the 19th century
Films set in the Czech Republic
Films shot in the Czech Republic
Films based on fairy tales